Lee Oval Jaynes Jr. (born July 25, 1940) is a former American football coach and college athletics administrator.

Jaynes was the head football coach at Gardner–Webb University from 1975 to 1977, compiling an overall record of 14–15 in three seasons.  He was an assistant coach for three seasons at the University of Wyoming and became an associate athletic director at Auburn University in 1981.

Jaynes was an athletic director at five universities: he was hired at Colorado State University in 1986, the University of Pittsburgh in 1991, the University of Idaho in 1996, the University of Tennessee at Chattanooga in 1998, and Jacksonville State University in 2008. His salary as athletic director was $118,000 at Pittsburgh in 1991, and $88,000 at Idaho in 1996.

He served as an assistant football coach and head wrestling coach at The Citadel in the 1965–66 season.

Jaynes did not use his middle name "Oval" until high school, when there were multiple players named "Lee" on the freshman football team.

Head coaching record

References

1940 births
Living people
Appalachian State Mountaineers baseball players
Appalachian State Mountaineers football players
Auburn University personnel
Chattanooga Mocs athletic directors
The Citadel Bulldogs football coaches
The Citadel Bulldogs wrestling coaches
Colorado State Rams athletic directors
Gardner–Webb Runnin' Bulldogs football coaches
Idaho Vandals athletic directors
Jacksonville State Gamecocks athletic directors
Pittsburgh Panthers athletic directors
South Carolina Gamecocks football coaches
Wake Forest Demon Deacons football coaches
Wyoming Cowboys football coaches
People from Morganton, North Carolina
Players of American football from North Carolina
Baseball players from North Carolina